Love is Fair is the 10th solo studio album by American country music singer, Barbara Mandrell, released in August 1980.

Love is Fair was Mandrell's first studio album of the decade. The album was successful for Mandrell, spawning four singles. The first single, "Crackers", peaked at #3 on the Country charts in 1980, and also charted on the Bubbling Under/Hot 100, her last single to chart there. The second single, "The Best of Strangers" was another Top 10 Country hit. The third single, "Love is Fair" peaked at #13 on the Country charts. The flip-side of that song, "Sometime, Somewhere, Somehow" charted on the Adult Contemporary charts in the Top 30. The album consisted of 10 tracks, including a cover of the Brenda Lee pop hit "Coming on Strong" and Michael Jackson's hit, "(S)He's Out of My Life".

Love Is Fair peaked at #6 on the Top Country Albums chart and also peaked at #175 on the Billboard 200, her fourth album to peak on the Billboard 200.

Track listing
"Love Is Fair" (Dennis Morgan, Kye Fleming)
"Crackers" (Morgan, Fleming)
"He's Out of My Life" (Tom Bahler)
with Randy Wright
"Not Tonight, I've Got a Heartache" (David Powelson)
"Long Time, No Love" (Morgan, Fleming)
"The Best of Strangers" (Morgan, Fleming)
"Sometime, Somewhere, Somehow" (Brant Beene, Jack Turner)
"My Bonnie Lies Over and Over" (John Schweers, R. C. Bannon)
"I'm Afraid He'll Find You (Somewhere in My Heart)" (Kerry Chater, Mitch Johnson)
"Coming on Strong" (Little David Wilkins)

Personnel
Acoustic Guitar: Jimmy Capps, Fred Tackett
Background Vocals: Lea Jane Berinati, Steve Brantley, Bruce Dees, Larry Keith, Dennis Morgan
Bass guitar: Mike Leech, Bob Wray
Drums: Larrie Londin, Kenny Malone, Buster Phillips
Duet Vocals: Randy Wright on "He's Out of My Life"
Electric Guitar: Pete Bordonali, Bruce Dees, Fred Newell
Electric Piano: Bobby Emmons, Bobby Ogdin
Lead Vocals: Barbara Mandrell
Piano: David Briggs
Steel Guitar: John Hughey
Strings: The Sheldon Kurland Strings
String Arranger: Archie Jordan, Mike Leech
Synthesizer: Tony Migliore

Chart performance

Charts

Weekly charts

Year-end charts

Singles

References

1980 albums
Barbara Mandrell albums
Albums produced by Tom Collins (record producer)
MCA Records albums